The bull trout (Salvelinus confluentus) is a char of the family Salmonidae native to northwestern North America. Historically, S. confluentus has been known as the "Dolly Varden" (S. malma), but was reclassified as a separate species in 1980. Bull trout are listed as a threatened species under the U.S. Endangered Species Act (1998) and as vulnerable on the IUCN Red List of Threatened Species.

Description
Like other species of char, the fins of a bull trout have white leading edges. Its head and mouth are unusually large for salmonids, giving it its name. Bull trout may be either migratory, moving throughout large river systems, lakes, and the ocean, or they may be resident, remaining in the same stream their entire lives. Migratory bull trout are typically much larger than resident bull trout, which rarely exceed . Bull trout can be differentiated from brook trout (S. fontinalis) by the absence of distinct spots on the dorsal fin, as well as yellow, orange, or salmon-colored spots on the back as opposed to red spots with blue halos on the brook trout. Bull trout lack the deeply forked tail fin of lake trout (S. namaycush, another char).

Distribution and habitat

S. confluentus is found in the cold, clear waters of the high mountains and coastal rivers of northwestern North America, including Yukon, British Columbia, Washington, Oregon, Idaho, and western Montana, as well as the Jarbidge River of northern Nevada. A population of bull trout exists east of the Continental Divide in Alberta, where it is the provincial fish.  The historical range of bull trout also included northern California, but they are likely extirpated.

Bull trout have exacting habitat demands, requiring water temperatures generally below 55 °F (13 °C), clean gravel beds, deep pools, complex cover such as snags and cut banks, and large systems of interconnected waterways to accommodate spawning migrations. Thus, they favor the deep pools of cold lakes and large rivers, as well as high, cold mountain headwaters. Bull trout may be anadromous in coastal rivers, and individual bull trout have been found to have migrated from one coastal river to another by the ocean.

Feeding
Young bull trout feed on zooplankton and zoobenthos, especially chironomids.  As they grow larger, they begin to feed heavily upon other fish. In coastal Washington, some of the southernmost populations of bull trout feed heavily on salmon eggs and fry, as well as fish.

Conservation

The bull trout is listed as a threatened species under the U.S. Endangered Species Act throughout its range in the contiguous United States. It is used as a management indicator species for several national forests, including Boise National Forest and Sawtooth National Forest (Sawtooth National Recreation Area).  They can also be found in the Glacier National Park. Bull trout reproduction requires cold water and very low amounts of silt, both of which are negatively impacted by road building and logging.  Additionally, its need to migrate throughout river systems may be hindered by impassible fish barriers, such as dams. Bull trout populations are also in danger from hybridization with non-native brook trout. Several of these issues were raised in a long-running lawsuit where in 2003, the Oregon Natural Desert Association and the Center for Biological Diversity sued the U.S. Forest Service claiming they violated the National Forest Management Act and Wild and Scenic Rivers Act by approving grazing plans in Oregon's Malheur National Forest.  In April, 2018, U.S. District Judge Michael W. Mosman dismissed the complaint.

They are a prized game fish in northern Canada. It was once maligned out of fear they threatened populations of other native species more prized by anglers.  Some jurisdictions publicize the requirement to release with the slogan "No black, put it back".

Historical names

"Dolly Varden" in California
Historically, confusion has existed between S. confluentus and Salvelinus malma malma, today commonly called the Dolly Varden trout.  This was likely due to overlapping ranges and similar appearances among members of the two species.

The first recorded use of the name "Dolly Varden" for a fish species was applied to members of S. confluentus caught in the McCloud River in northern California in the early 1870s. In his book Inland Fishes of California, Peter Moyle recounted a letter from Mrs. Valerie Masson Gomez:

In 1874, Livingston Stone, a naturalist working for the U.S. government, wrote of this fish: 

It is currently unknown whether the name "Dolly Varden" was later applied to S. m. malma because of its similar appearance to S. confluentus; the two may have even been believed to be the same species. The name "Dolly Varden" may have also been given to S. m. malma independent of the McCloud River fish.

Ironically, the original "Dolly Varden" trout (i.e., S. confluentus) apparently likely became extirpated in the McCloud River in the 1970s, although reports continue of its being caught.  Other fish species, typically introduced trout, outcompete S. confluentus, and can interbreed with them, resulting in sterile hybrids.  An attempt to reintroduce S. confluentus to the McCloud was unsuccessful, and no additional attempts are expected.

Other uses of "Dolly Varden"
The "Dolly Varden" name is also applied to the other subspecies of S. malma, the S. m. krascheninnikova, and S. m. miyabei, found in Lake Shikaribetsu on the island of Hokkaidō in Japan.

The name has also been applied to S. alpinus, today more commonly known as Arctic char.

"Bull trout" in Europe
The name "bull trout" was also given in the past to some of the large sea trout that run the River Tweed and other rivers in Scotland and North East England. Victorian anglers and others classified these as a separate race, but today they are biologically classified along with all other UK brown and sea trout as Salmo trutta. This does not deny that populations of S. trutta can differ appreciably in habits, size, and appearance from place to place, or indeed in the same river or lake.

References

Salvelinus
Fish of Japan
Fish of North America
Fish of the Western United States
Provincial symbols of Alberta
Fish described in 1859
ESA threatened species